AIMP (Artem Izmaylov Media Player) is a freeware audio player for Windows and Android, originally developed by Russian developer Artem Izmaylov.

Development
The first version of AIMP was released on August 8, 2006. AIMP was initially based on the BASS  audio library. Version 3 added a new audio engine and full support for ReplayGain, and revamped the music library interface transparency effects.

Features
AIMP supports audio codecs, including MP3, AAC, Dolby AC-3, Ogg Vorbis, Opus, Speex, Windows Media Audio, Apple Lossless, FLAC, WAV,  Audio CDs,  APE, True Audio; DTS audio, MP1, MP2, Musepack, OptimFROG,  WavPack, MIDI, Impulse Tracker, MO3, MOD, MultiTracker Module, S3M, Tom's lossless Audio Kompressor (TAK), and FastTracker 2 Extended Module.

AIMP supports the DirectSound, ASIO and WASAPI audio interfaces, and it uses 32-bit audio processing for its 18-band equalizer and built-in sound effects (Reverb, Flanger, Chorus, Pitch, Tempo, Echo, Speed, Bass, Enhancer, Voice Remover).

AIMP can cache, in RAM, the currently played media file, up to 250 MB, during playback. 

AIMP is also able to cache up to 60 seconds of internet radio streams into RAM.  One drawback of this function is that channel switching is slowed as the buffer is first filled up to at least 25% before the playback starts (i.e. with 60 seconds of cache selected, the music will take up to 15 seconds to start playing).    

 Other features
 LastFM scrobbler
 Bookmark and playback queue creation
 Multiple playlists, one per tab
 CUE sheet support
 Playing media files of up to 250 MB directly from RAM
 Internet radio stream capturing
 Multi-user mode support
 Multi-language interface
 Hotkeys (configurable local and global hotkeys)
 Playlist and tag editor
 Audio library file organizer and search
 Alarm clock / Auto shutdown
 Support for plug-ins and skins

Awards
On September 6, 2007, Softpedia editor Ionut Ilascu gave AIMP Classic 2.02 Beta a rating of 4 out of 5 stars.
On November 6, 2009, CNET editors also gave AIMP2 a 4 out of 5 star rating.
On September 23, 2016, TechRadar editor Cat Ellis ranked AIMP4 at the 2nd place of the best free music players of 2016.

Third-party scam warning
The developers of AIMP warn on their official website that there is an ongoing scam by the unknown fraudsters behind the website aimp2.us, which has no connection whatsoever to the AIMP development team, and call upon its users not to donate any money to this fake site. AIMP is a freeware program and as such brought to the users free of charge.

See also
 Comparison of audio player software

References

External links
 
 https://portableapps.com/apps/music_video/aimp-portable

2006 software
Windows media players
Streaming software
Tag editors
Android (operating system) software
Android media players